Jemima Condict was an American diarist from colonial New Jersey.

Biography
Jemima Condict was born in the mountains of northwestern New Jersey on 24 August 1754. Her parents were Ruth Harrison (of Samuel) and Daniel Condit of Samuel Condit and Mary Dodd, Jemima's grandparents referenced in Jemima's colonial, Revolutionary War-era diary housed by the New Jersey Historical Society. She married the Revolutionary War Captain Aaron Harrison (of Samuel).

Jemima spent her entire life in the vicinity of Pleasantdale, which is now in West Orange, New Jersey, dying on 14 November 1779 at the age of twenty-five. She was educated enough to be able to write. At the age of seventeen, in early 1772, she began a diary and made sporadic entries in it for the rest of her life. In "Guide to the Jemima Condict Diary 1772-1779 MG 123" published online by The New Jersey Historical Society" it explains "Although her name by birth was Condit, she added a "c" to her name against her parents behest."

Condict titled her diary "J2M3M1 C59D3CT H2R B44K 19D P29", using a code that also appeared in a number of the diary's lines of verse. She used the numbers 1–9 to replace the letters a, e, i, o, u, y, t, s, and n, in that order. The decoded title reads; "JEMIMA CUNDICT HER BOOK AND PEN".

Diary

The only published full text of the diary is titled "Her Book, Being a transcript of the diary of an Essex County maid during the Revolutionary War". It was published in a collectors' edition of only 200 copies by the typographer Frederic Goudy and his wife Bertha Goudy. Two other books, one by Elizabeth Evans and the other by June Sprigg, contain many of Jemima Condict's entries.

Jemima Condict was religious and most of her diary consists of listings of religious teachings she heard, with occasional commentary. Her writing provides evidence of the lives of her family and community, as well as events of the Revolutionary War.

News of the Boston Tea Party had reached rural New Jersey as Jemima Condict wrote ten months after that event.

 "Saturday October first 1774. 
 
 
 
 
 
 "

Condict briefly mentions the inoculation of her cousins, probably against smallpox, using a weak strain of the disease long before Edward Jenner developed cowpox-based vaccination is of scientific interest.

 "Monday February 5, 1775, 
 
 
 
 
 
 
 "

An entry from March 1775 describes a local party for some newly-weds. She makes reference to "horse neck kites", natives of Horseneck Tract.

 "
 
 
 
 
 
 
 
 
 
 
 "

In her entry for April 23, 1775, she relates events that occurred in the aftermath of the Battles of Lexington and Concord. The "Regulors" or "regulers" are “regular” British soldiers.

 "
 
 
 
 
 "

A local violent death caught her attention in 1775.

 "
 
 
 
 
 
 
 killed him immediately..."

Condit wrote about the local Revolutionary War fighting during the Battle of Elizabethtown" in what is now Elizabeth, New Jersey.

 
 
 
 
 
 
 
 
 
 "

Any notice of July 4, 1776, is notably absent.

The manuscript diary is held in the collections of the New Jersey Historical Society's Manuscript Group 123.

References

Further reading 
 Rutgers University, New Jersey Women's History. "Image of a single page from the original diary.". Accessed September 29, 2007.

Women diarists
American diarists
American Revolutionary War Diarists
People of colonial New Jersey
1754 births
1779 deaths
People from West Orange, New Jersey
Writers from New Jersey
18th-century American women writers
18th-century diarists